The African lanternshark (Etmopterus polli) is a shark of the family Etmopteridae found in the eastern Atlantic  between latitudes 12°N and 18°S, at depths between 300 and 1,000 m.  Its length is up to 30 cm.

Reproduction is ovoviviparous.

Etymology
The shark is named in honor of Belgian ichthyologist Max Poll, who had discovered the species and sent the specimens to Harvard’s Museum of Comparative Zoology for description.

References

 
 Compagno, Dando, & Fowler, Sharks of the World, Princeton University Press, New Jersey 2005 

Etmopterus
Taxa named by Henry Bryant Bigelow 
Taxa named by William Charles Schroeder
Taxa named by Stewart Springer
Fish described in 1953